Roland Ferrandi (also Orlandu Ferrandi; born in 1958) is a  Corsican composer-ceterist, lutenist and theorbist.

Biography

Discography

References

External links 
 

1958 births
Living people
People from Corsica
Composers for lute
Composers for the classical guitar
French classical guitarists
French male guitarists
Lutenists